Tom Parratt (born 2 March 1986) is a Scottish professional footballer who most recently played for the Wilmington Hammerheads in the United Soccer League.

Early life
Parratt was born in Inverness, Scotland, but moved to the United States with his family at the age of three. He grew up in Iowa City, Iowa, attended Iowa City High School, and played club football for Iowa City Alliance, where his father Ian is Director of Coaching, and attended the US National U-14 training camp.

Club career

Birmingham City
At the age of 15, Parratt moved to England to join Birmingham City, and after a year's acclimatisation began a three-year scholarship programme with Birmingham's Academy. During his time with Birmingham he played for the Scotland under-19 team.

Inverness Caledonian Thistle
Released by Birmingham at the end of the 2004–05 season, Parratt returned to the place of his birth to join Inverness Caledonian Thistle of the Scottish Premier League (SPL) on a two-and-a-half-year contract. He was primarily used as a substitute, and made his debut as a second-half substitute in the Scottish League Cup against Alloa Athletic.

Hamilton Academical
Released by the club at the end of the 2005–06 season, he signed for Hamilton Academical in August 2006, and established himself as the club's first-choice right back. The following year he was an integral part of the impressive 2007–08 season title winning team, and part of a defence that only conceded three goals at home the entire season.

Queen of the South
On 27 August 2008 Parratt joined First Division side Queen of the South of Dumfries. He made his debut playing in the 3–1 home league defeat of Dundee on 30 August. He left Queen of the South at the end of January 2009 wishing to pursue options elsewhere.

Airdrie United
In August 2009 Parratt returned to Scotland joined Airdrie United. Following the 2009–10 season he returned to America.

Wilmington Hammerheads
Parratt turned to the United States in 2011 and signed with Wilmington Hammerheads of the USL Pro division.

Wilmington re-signed Parratt for the 2012 season on 13 February 2012.

International career
Following impressive performances for Birmingham City's Reserves, he was called up to the Scotland under-19 team playing 15 times and was the only player to start every game in 2005.

Honours
Hamilton Academical
Scottish Football League First Division: 2007–08

References

External links

1986 births
Living people
Footballers from Inverness
Scottish footballers
Association football fullbacks
Birmingham City F.C. players
Inverness Caledonian Thistle F.C. players
Hamilton Academical F.C. players
Queen of the South F.C. players
Airdrieonians F.C. players
Wilmington Hammerheads FC players
Scottish Football League players
USL Championship players
Scotland youth international footballers
Scottish expatriate sportspeople in the United States
Expatriate soccer players in the United States
Scottish expatriate footballers
Soccer players from Iowa
Sportspeople from Iowa City, Iowa